Kajan is a village and a former municipality in the Elbasan County, central Albania. At the 2015 local government reform it became a subdivision of the municipality Belsh. The population at the 2011 census was 3,925. The municipal unit consists of the villages Dragot-Fushë, Lisaj, Kajan, Dragot, Gjinuk, Gjolene, Turbull, Çestije, Merhoj and Idriz.

References

Administrative units of Belsh
Former municipalities in Elbasan County
Villages in Elbasan County